The Sun Odyssey 379 is a French sailboat that was designed by Marc Lombard as a cruiser and first built in 2011.

The design was named the 2012 Domestic Boat of the Year and Best Midsize Cruiser by Cruising World magazine.

The design was developed into the Sun Odyssey 389 in 2015.

Production
The design was built by Jeanneau in France, from 2011 until 2015, but it is now out of production.

Design
The Sun Odyssey 379 is a recreational keelboat, built predominantly of polyester fiberglass, with wood trim. The hull is made from solid handlaid fiberglass, while the deck is injection-molded and cored with balsa. It has a 9/10 fractional sloop rig, with a deck-stepped mast, two sets of swept spreaders and aluminum spars with 1X19 stainless steel wire rigging. The hull has a hard chine, a plumb stem, a reverse transom with a drop-down tailgate, an internally mounted spade-type rudder controlled by dual wheels tiller and a fixed "L"-shaped fin keel with a weighted bulb, optional shoal-draft wing keel or stub keel and centerboard, combined with twin rudders. A life raft well is fitted aft.

The fin keel model displaces  empty and carries  of cast iron ballast, the shoal draft version displaces  and carries  of cast iron ballast, while the centerboard version displaces  and carries  of ballast.

The design was built with two and three cabin interior arrangements. The two cabin version has sleeping accommodation for four people, with a double "V"-berth in the bow cabin, a "U"-shaped settee and a straight settee in the main cabin and an aft cabin with a double berth on the starboard side. The three cabin interior adds a second aft cabin on the port side. The galley is located on the starboard side just forward of the companionway ladder. The galley is "L"-shaped and is equipped with a two-burner stove, an ice box and a double sink. A navigation station is opposite the galley, on the port side. The head is located at the companionway on the port side and is larger on the two cabin.

Operational history
In a 2012 boats.com review, Zuzana Prochazka wrote, "it is a sign of the times that a 37-foot boat like the Jeanneau Sun Odyssey 379 is the entry length in a new product line. Boats have been getting bigger in recent years but larger has not necessarily meant more unique or comfortable. It seems to take more innovation to create a streamlined vessel that offers as much as bigger models, which is exactly what Jeanneau has done with this boat."

In Sail Magazine, Bill Springer's 2012 review concluded, "plenty of boats call themselves good-looking and rewarding to sail. Many boats are also designed to be comfortable at sea and in port. But after testing the Jeanneau Sun Odyssey 379 in a healthy sailing breeze, I can honestly say it comes closer to achieving these goals than most. It was a blast to sail. It was easy to sail. It was comfortable to sail, and its accommodations are both spacious and stylish."

Alvah Simon wrote in a 2013 review for Cruising World, "while wanting to appear hard hitting and discerning, I am hard pressed to find any criticisms of this boat. It’s the rare boat I test that I would personally want to own and operate. But for me the 379 hits its marks perfectly regarding safety, size, style, speed, accommodation and equipment."

See also
List of sailing boat types

References

External links

Keelboats
2010s sailboat type designs
Sailing yachts
Sailboat type designs by Marc Lombard Design
Sailboat types built by Jeanneau